Jean-Michel Lucenay (born 25 April 1978) is a French épée fencer. He won the gold medal with the French team at the 2016 Summer Olympics in Rio de Janeiro.

References

External links
 
 

1978 births
Living people
Sportspeople from Fort-de-France
Martiniquais fencers
French male épée fencers
Fencers at the 2008 Summer Olympics
Fencers at the 2016 Summer Olympics
Olympic fencers of France
French people of Martiniquais descent
Olympic gold medalists for France
Olympic medalists in fencing
Medalists at the 2016 Summer Olympics
Universiade medalists in fencing
Mediterranean Games silver medalists for France
Mediterranean Games medalists in fencing
Competitors at the 2005 Mediterranean Games
Universiade gold medalists for France
World Fencing Championships medalists
Medalists at the 2003 Summer Universiade